In medicine or biology, a diverticulum is  an outpouching of a hollow (or a fluid-filled) structure in the body. Depending upon which layers of the structure are involved, diverticula are described as being either true or false.

In medicine, the term usually implies the structure is not normally present, but in embryology, the term is used for some normal structures arising from others, as for instance the thyroid diverticulum, which arises from the tongue.

The word comes from Latin dīverticulum, "bypath" or "byway".

Classification
Diverticula are described as being true or false depending upon the layers involved:

False diverticula (also known as "pseudodiverticula") do not involve muscular layers or adventitia. False diverticula, in the gastrointestinal tract for instance, involve only the submucosa and mucosa.
True diverticula involve all layers of the structure, including muscularis propria and adventitia, such as Meckel's diverticulum.

Embryology
The kidneys are originally diverticula in the development of the urinary and reproductive organs.
The lungs are originally diverticula forming off of the ventral foregut.
The thymus appears in the form of two flask-shape diverticula, which arise from the third branchial pouch (pharyngeal pouch) of the endoderm.
The thyroid gland develops as a diverticulum arising from a point on the tongue, demarcated as the foramen cecum.

Human pathology

Gastrointestinal tract diverticula 
Esophageal diverticula may occur in one of three areas of the esophagus:
Pharyngeal (Zenker's) diverticula usually occur in the elderly, through Killian's triangle above the cricopharyngeal muscle.
Midesophageal diverticula
Epiphrenic diverticula are due to dysfunction of the lower esophageal sphincter, as in achalasia.
A duodenal diverticulum can be found incidentally in 23% of normal people undergoing imaging. It can be either congenital or acquired, but the acquired form is more common and is due to the weakness of the duodenal wall, which causes protrusions. It is usually found at the second or third part of duodenum, around the ampulla of Vater. Food debris may enter the diverticular outpouchings, causing inflammation or diverticulitis. On CT or MRI imaging, it appears as a sac-like outpouching. If the diverticulum is filled with contrast agents, the wall would be thin and may contain air, fluid, contrast material, or food debris. If the food debris is broken down by bacteria, the outpouching may show "faeces sign". Inflammation of the duodenal wall shows thickening of the wall. Rarely, on barium studies in congenital duodenal diverticula, the contrast material fills up the true lumen, causing "windsock" deformity.
A jejunal diverticulum is a congenital lesion and may be a source of bacterial overgrowth. It may also perforate or result in abscesses.
A Killian-Jamieson diverticulum is very similar to a pharyngeal esophageal diverticulum, differing in the fact that the pouching is below the cricopharyngeal muscle.
Colonic diverticula, although found incidentally during colonoscopy,  may become infected (see diverticulitis) and can perforate, requiring surgery.
Gastric diverticula are very infrequent.
Meckel's diverticulum, a persistent portion of the omphalomesenteric duct, is present in 2% of the population, making it the most common congenital gastrointestinal malformation.

Rokitansky-Aschoff sinuses are diverticula in the gallbladder due to chronic cholecystitis

Most of these pathological types of diverticula are capable of harboring an enterolith. If the enterolith stays in place, it may cause no problems, but a large enterolith expelled from a diverticulum into the lumen can cause obstruction.

Genito-urinary tract diverticula 
Bladder diverticula are balloon-like growths on the bladder commonly associated with chronic outflow obstruction, such as benign prostatic hyperplasia in older males. Usually found in pairs on opposite sides of the bladder, bladder diverticula are often surgically removed to prevent infection, rupture, or even cancer.
Calyceal diverticula are usually asymptomatic, but if a stone becomes lodged in the outpouching, they may present with pain.
Urethral diverticula are usually found in women aged 30 to 70 years old, in between 1 and 6% of adult women. Since most cases are without any symptoms, the true incidence is unknown. Symptoms may vary from frequent urinary tract infections, painful sexual intercourse (dyspareunia), or symptoms due to cancer. A urethral diverticulum is located on the anterior vaginal wall, 1 to 3 cm inside the vaginal introitus. MRI is preferred as the imaging method of choice due to its excellent soft-tissue resolution. Vaginal ultrasonography is highly sensitive in diagnosing the diverticulum, but it is strongly dependent on the skills of the operator.

Other diverticula 
A diverticulum of Kommerell is an outpouching (aneurysm) of the aorta where an aberrant right subclavian artery is located. It is unusual nomenclature, in that focal dilatations of a blood vessel are properly referred to as aneurysms.
Cardiac diverticulum is a very rare congenital malformation of the heart that is usually benign.

Gallery

See also
Christine Menias
Skeletal pneumaticity

References

External links 

Medical terminology